Moldova participated in the Eurovision Song Contest 2008 with the song "A Century of Love" written by Oleg Baraliuc and Victoria Demici. The song was performed by Geta Burlacu. The Moldovan broadcaster TeleRadio-Moldova (TRM) organised the national final O melodie pentru Europa 2008 in order to select the Moldovan entry for the 2008 contest in Belgrade, Serbia. 27 entries competed to represent Moldova in Belgrade, with 12 being shortlisted to participate in the televised national final which took place on 9 February 2008. "A Century of Love" performed by Geta Burlacu emerged as the winner after gaining the most points following the combination of votes from a jury panel, a TRM committee and a public televote.

Moldova was drawn to compete in the first semi-final of the Eurovision Song Contest which took place on 20 May 2008. Performing during the show in position 4, "A Century of Love" was not announced among the 10 qualifying entries of the first semi-final and therefore did not qualify to compete in the final. This marked the first time that Moldova failed to qualify to the final of the Eurovision Song Contest from a semi-final since its first entry in 2005. It was later revealed that Moldova placed twelfth out of the 19 participating countries in the semi-final with 36 points.

Background 

Prior to the 2008 Contest, Moldova had participated in the Eurovision Song Contest three times since its first entry in 2005. The nation's best placing in the contest was sixth, which it achieved in 2005 with the song "Boonika bate doba" performed by Zdob și Zdub. Other than their debut entry, to this point, Moldova's only other top ten placing at the contest was achieved in 2007 where "Fight" performed by Natalia Barbu placed tenth.

The Moldovan national broadcaster, TeleRadio-Moldova (TRM), broadcast the event within Moldova and organised the selection process for the nation's entry. TRM confirmed their intentions to participate at the 2008 Eurovision Song Contest on 5 November 2007 despite rumours of a withdrawal due to financial difficulties. Moldova has selected their entry via an internal selection in 2007. However, the broadcaster opted to select their entry in 2008 via a national selection show.

Before Eurovision

O melodie pentru Europa 2008 
O melodie pentru Europa 2008 was the national final format developed by TRM in order to select Moldova's entry for the Eurovision Song Contest 2008. The event took place at the National Palace in Chișinău, hosted by Rusalina Rusu and Sergiu Raelanu, and included a final to be held on 9 February 2008. The show was broadcast on Moldova 1, TV Moldova Internațional and Radio Moldova as well as online via TRM's official website trm.md.

Competing entries 
Artists and composers had the opportunity to submit their entries between 5 November 2007 to 11 December 2007. Artists were required to be of Moldovan nationality and could submit more than one song, while an international act was able to compete only if they were either part of a duo or group with at least a member who was of Moldovan nationality or were part of the backing performers with a maximum of two international members. Songwriters could hold any nationality. At the conclusion of the submission deadline, 27 valid entries received by the broadcaster. A jury selected 12 finalists out of the 27 received entries while taking the results of an online vote on trm.md into consideration, which were announced on 14 December 2007.

Final
The final took place on 9 February 2008. Twelve songs competed and the winner was selected based on the combination of a public televote, the votes of an expert jury and the votes of a committee consisting of TRM representatives. The expert jury included Ghenadie Ciobanu (President of the Union of Composers of Moldova), Anatol Chiriac (composer), Titus Zhukov (Head of the Republican Puppet Theater "Licurici"), Natalia Brasnuev (President of OGAE Moldova), Sergey Gavrilice (editor of VIP Magazin), Vasile Năstase (editor of Glasul Naţiunii), Diana Stratulat (producer) and Victoria Buketaru (director of Fresh FM), while the committee included George Musta (conductor of the TRM National Symphony Orchestra), Ion Kerpek (music producer), Vadim Styngachu (TRM representative of television) and Boris Foksa (member of the TRM coordinatory unit). In addition to the performances of the competing entries, 2006 Moldovan Eurovision entrant Natalia Gordienko and 2007 Moldovan Eurovision entrant Natalia Barbu performed as guests.

At the conclusion of the voting, Geta Burlacu and Olia Tira were tied at 30 points each. The tie was resolved with each member of the expert jury and committee casting one vote for one of the two songs, and "A Century of Love" performed by Geta Burlacu was selected as the winner with 7 votes to 5.

Preparation 
On 20 March, Geta Burlacu released the final version of "A Century of Love" which featured an improved arrangement and the use of additional instruments. The official music video for the song premiered on 15 April.

Promotion 
Geta Burlacu made several appearances across Europe to specifically promote "A Century of Love" as the Moldovan Eurovision entry. On 23 February, Geta Burlacu performed the Moldovan entry as a guest during the Ukrainian Eurovision national final. On 4 and 5 April, Burlacu took part in promotional activities in Romania which included television appearances.

At Eurovision 
It was announced in September 2007 that the competition's format would be expanded to two semi-finals in 2008. According to the rules, all nations with the exceptions of the host country and the "Big Four" (France, Germany, Spain and the United Kingdom) are required to qualify from one of two semi-finals in order to compete for the final; the top nine songs from each semi-final as determined by televoting progress to the final, and a tenth was determined by back-up juries. The European Broadcasting Union (EBU) split up the competing countries into six different pots based on voting patterns from previous contests, with countries with favourable voting histories put into the same pot. On 28 January 2008, a special allocation draw was held which placed each country into one of the two semi-finals. Moldova was placed into the first semi-final, to be held on 20 May 2008. The running order for the semi-finals was decided through another draw on 17 March 2008 and Moldova was set to perform in position 4, following the entry from Estonia and before the entry from San Marino.

The two semi-finals and the final were televised in Moldova on Moldova 1 and TV Moldova Internațional. All broadcasts featured commentary by Lucia Danu and Vitalie Rotaru. The Moldovan spokesperson, who announced the Moldovan votes during the final, was Vitalie Rotaru.

Semi-final 
Geta Burlacu took part in technical rehearsals on 11 and 15 May, followed by dress rehearsals on 19 and 20 May. The Moldovan performance featured Burlacu dressed in a purple dress with a white and red petticoat underneath as well as a red scarf, and performing on stage barefoot with a trumpet player who wore a red shirt and white trousers. The performance began with Geta Burlacu sitting on a big white sofa and holding a teddy bear in her hands with the trumpet player kneeling in front of it, while it was concluded with Burlacu cuddling in the lap of the trumpet player on the sofa at the end. The stage featured LED screen projections of red, dark green and yellow colours. The trumpet player that joined Geta Burlacu on stage is Petru Haruta.

At the end of the show, Moldova was not announced among the top 10 entries in the first semi-final and therefore failed to qualify to compete in the final. This marked the first time that Moldova failed to qualify to the final of the Eurovision Song Contest from a semi-final since its first entry in 2005. It was later revealed that Moldova placed twelfth in the semi-final, receiving a total of 36 points.

Voting 
Below is a breakdown of points awarded to Moldova and awarded by Moldova in the first semi-final and grand final of the contest. The nation awarded its 12 points to Romania in the semi-final and the final of the contest.

Points awarded to Moldova

Points awarded by Moldova

References

2008
Countries in the Eurovision Song Contest 2008
Eurovision